Erich Linemayr (24 January 1933 in Linz – 4 June 2016) was an Austrian football referee. He is known for having refereed three matches in the FIFA World Cup, two in 1974 and one in 1978. He also refereed two matches in the 1980 UEFA European Football Championship in Italy and the European Cup final in 1979.

His most unusual match was the  return game of the UEFA–CONMEBOL play-off between Chile and the Soviet Union (who had refused to travel to Santiago for the match) on 21 November 1973.  When Chile scored a goal after 30 seconds, Linemayr immediately blew off the game and declared them winners.

References

Profile

1933 births
2016 deaths
Sportspeople from Linz
Austrian football referees
FIFA World Cup referees
1978 FIFA World Cup referees
1974 FIFA World Cup referees
UEFA Euro 1980 referees